The 2022 BWF World Junior Championships was the twenty-second edition of the BWF World Junior Championships. It was held in Santander, Spain at the Palacio de Deportes de Santander from 17 to 30 October 2022. Individual players competed to win the Eye Level Cup presented by the former BWF President and chairman of the World Youth Culture Foundation, Kang Young-joong, and the mixed team competed to win Suhandinata Cup.

Host city selection
Spain was awarded the event in November 2018 during the announcement of 18 major badminton event hosts from 2019 to 2025.

Medalists

Medal table

References

 
BWF World Junior Championships
International sports competitions hosted by Spain
Badminton tournaments in Spain
BWF World Junior Championships
BWF World Junior
BWF World Junior
BWF